Ädelost (meaning "noble cheese" or "fine cheese") is blue cheese from Sweden, made from pasteurized cow's milk. Swedish-made cheese, which is called "ädelost" or "ädel", is generally made from cow's milk and can be said to be a Swedish version of the French blue cheese.

Notable characteristics
Notable characteristics include a light cream color with evenly distributed blue-gray veins and a sharp, salty flavor. It is often used as a table cheese.

References

Further reading
 Dictionary of Food: International Food and Cooking Terms from A to Z - Charles Sinclair - Google Books

Blue cheeses
Swedish cheeses